Blik (stylised: blik) is a payment system in Poland that allows users to make instant payments and withdraw cash using only the user's standard mobile banking app.

The system allows users to make online and in-store purchases and to transfer money in real time between bank accounts and ATMs, including cash withdrawal from ATMs, without the need of a payment card. Transactions are uniquely identified by a 6-digit one-time code, valid for 2 minutes, which the user generates and authenticates in their mobile banking app. The code can then be typed in online, entered on the ATM screen, or typed by the payment recipient in their mobile app. The resulting payments are near instant.

Blik allows phone number transfers by binding a phone number with a bank account. These transfers are free and instantaneous, even between accounts from different banks. Some online shopping platforms, like Allegro, are able to connect a customer account to a Blik-compatible app instance allowing for payment confirmation with just a notification prompt and pin code or biometric login.

Blik was launched in February 2015 by Polski Standard Płatności, an alliance of six Polish banks, itself a member of the European Mobile Payment Systems Association. The number of participating banks has grown since. Blik had 8,6 million users  and processed 424 million transactions in 2020.

In 2021, Blik introduced mobile contactless payments in ground terminals.

Between 2019 and 2020, police reported several cases of fraud using Blik ATM withdrawal. By gaining access to a person's social media account, the perpetrator is able to request a loan from acquaintances and perform cash withdrawals if provided with a Blik code.

Participating banks 
The Blik service is available from the following banks:

 Alior Bank,
 Bank Millennium
 BNP Paribas
 Citi Handlowy
 Crédit Agricole
 Getin Bank
 ING Bank Śląski
 Nest Bank
 Getin Noble Bank
 mBank
 Bank Pocztowy
 Bank Pekao
 PKO Bank Polski & Inteligo
 Santander Bank Polska
 Bank Polskiej Spółdzielczości (BPS)
 Spółdzielcza Grupa Bankow (SGB)

References

External links

Financial services companies of Poland
Mobile payments
Financial technology companies
Payment systems
Online payments